Isaac Applewhite House is a historic house on Church Street in Chappell Hill, Texas.

It was built in 1852 and added to the National Register of Historic Places in 1985.

See also

National Register of Historic Places listings in Washington County, Texas
Recorded Texas Historic Landmarks in Washington County

References

Houses on the National Register of Historic Places in Texas
National Register of Historic Places in Washington County, Texas
Houses completed in 1852
Houses in Washington County, Texas
Recorded Texas Historic Landmarks
1852 establishments in Texas